The Hebe Society promotes the cultivation and conservation of hebes and other New Zealand native plants.

It was formed in 1985 by a group of enthusiastic gardeners and nurserymen, under the auspices of the Royal Horticultural Society. The role of the Society is to stimulate an interest in hebes and other New Zealand native plants. The Hebe Society is a non-profit organisation.

Most members are in the British Isles, but some are in Europe, North America and New Zealand.  The Hebe Society provides members with information about familiar and less well known hebes and other New Zealand native plants, how to grow them and where they may be obtained.  The Society aims to ensure that all garden worthy hebes and New Zealand plants remain in cultivation and have the widest distribution.

Plant Information
 Information on over 200 hebes
 Information on nearly 200 New Zealand native plants

Publications
The Hebe Society produces a magazine, Hebe News, four times a year.  It is illustrated in colour with contributions from UK and international plant enthusiasts, and contains articles on hebes and New Zealand native plants and gardens.

Cuttings Exchange and Seed Distribution
Cuttings or seeds are swapped via the quarterly magazine Hebe News.  Many less well-known, but worthwhile, plants can be received.  This is a good way for members to increase their collection of hebes and New Zealand native plants.

Shows
The society exhibits at 4 major shows throughout the UK to stimulate interest in hebes and other New Zealand native plants.  The shows are: HPS (Kent Group), Arley Garden Festival (Cheshire), Great Gardening Show (Surrey), and Llangollen Gardening Show (north Wales).

Picture Library
An extensive library of slides and digital images covering a wide range of hebes and New Zealand native plants is available to members on loan.

Collections
Collections of hebes are held by members in Guernsey, North Yorkshire, and The Quinta Arboretum, Swettenham, Cheshire.

It is British Registered Charity No 801398 and is affiliated to the Royal Horticultural Society, New Zealand Alpine Garden Society and the Tatton Garden Society.

External links
 Hebe Society
 Books on hebes
 Books on New Zealand native plants
 

Charities based in England
Horticultural organisations based in the United Kingdom